Kotshkorkia is an extinct genus of ants of the subfamily Dolichoderinae.  The genus contains a single described species Kotshkorkia laticeps. It was described by Dlussky in 1981, where the first fossils of the ant were found in Russia.

References

†
Monotypic fossil ant genera
Fossil taxa described in 1981
Fossils of Russia